Mount Nailog is one of the two prominent peaks of Sibuyan Island, Philippines with a height of .

Nailog
Landforms of Romblon